This is a list of 323 species in Stilobezzia, a genus of predaceous midges in the family Ceratopogonidae.

Stilobezzia species

 Stilobezzia acrotrichis Tokunaga, 1959 c g
 Stilobezzia addita Clastrier, 1986 c g
 Stilobezzia afra Clastrier, 1991 c g
 Stilobezzia africana (Ingram & Macfie, 1921) c
 Stilobezzia afrotropica Clastrier, 1991 c g
 Stilobezzia alba Tokunaga, 1940 c g
 Stilobezzia albiabdominalis Tokunaga & Murachi, 1959 c g
 Stilobezzia albicoxa Lane & Forattini, 1956 c g
 Stilobezzia albocincta Kieffer, 1917 c g
 Stilobezzia amaniensis Meillon, 1980 c g
 Stilobezzia amazonica Clastrier, 1991 c g
 Stilobezzia americana Kieffer, 1917 c g
 Stilobezzia amnigena (Macfie, 1935) c g
 Stilobezzia amplistyla Clastrier, 1989 c g
 Stilobezzia angustipennis Clastrier, 1991 c g
 Stilobezzia antennalis (Coquillett, 1901) i c g b
 Stilobezzia antipodalis Ingram & Macfie, 1931 c g
 Stilobezzia areolaris (Kieffer, 1911) c g
 Stilobezzia armatibiae Tokunaga, 1963 c g
 Stilobezzia artistyla Gupta & Wirth, 1968 c g
 Stilobezzia atrichopogon Lane & Forattini, 1956 c g
 Stilobezzia atronitens Goetghebuer, 1933 c g
 Stilobezzia aureola Clastrier, 1963 c g
 Stilobezzia badia Macfie, 1932 c g
 Stilobezzia baojia Liu & Shi, 2002 c g
 Stilobezzia basizonata Tokunaga, 1963 c g
 Stilobezzia bata Meillon & Hardy, 1954 c g
 Stilobezzia beckae Wirth, 1953 i c g b
 Stilobezzia biangulata Tokunaga, 1963 c g
 Stilobezzia bicinctipes Ingram & Macfie, 1931 c g
 Stilobezzia bicolor Lane, 1947 i c g
 Stilobezzia bifurcata Tokunaga, 1959 c g
 Stilobezzia bimacula (Kieffer, 1910) c g
 Stilobezzia bimaculata Lane & Forattini, 1956 c g
 Stilobezzia bispinosa Kieffer, 1917 c g
 Stilobezzia bizonata Tokunaga, 1963 c g
 Stilobezzia blantoni Lane & Forattini, 1956 c g
 Stilobezzia brandti Tokunaga, 1963 c g
 Stilobezzia brevicornis Clastrier, 1991 c g
 Stilobezzia brevicostalis Gupta & Wirth, 1968 c g
 Stilobezzia brevistyla Clastrier, 1989 c g
 Stilobezzia browni Wirth & Giles, 1990 c g
 Stilobezzia bulla Thomsen, 1935 i c g
 Stilobezzia calcaris Tokunaga & Murachi, 1959 c g
 Stilobezzia carayoni Clastrier, 1986 c g
 Stilobezzia caribe Lane & Forattini, 1958 c g
 Stilobezzia castanea Macfie, 1934 c g
 Stilobezzia centripictura Tokunaga, 1963 c g
 Stilobezzia cereola Clastrier, 1963 c g
 Stilobezzia chaconi Macfie, 1938 c g
 Stilobezzia challieri Vattier & Adam, 1966 c g
 Stilobezzia chasteli Clastrier, 1967 c g
 Stilobezzia chlorosa Clastrier, 1986 c g
 Stilobezzia clarifemorata Gupta & Wirth, 1968 c g
 Stilobezzia claripennis Clastrier & Wirth, 1958 c g
 Stilobezzia claripes Gupta & Wirth, 1968 c g
 Stilobezzia clavicula Tokunaga, 1963 c g
 Stilobezzia collessi Wirth & Grogan, 1988 c g
 Stilobezzia congestiterga Gupta & Wirth, 1968 c g
 Stilobezzia contans Gupta & Wirth, 1968 c g
 Stilobezzia coquilletti Kieffer, 1917 i c g b
 Stilobezzia coracina Kieffer, 1917 c g
 Stilobezzia corneti Clastrier, 1991 c g
 Stilobezzia crassiforceps Tokunaga, 1963 c g
 Stilobezzia crassipes Kieffer, 1918 c g
 Stilobezzia crassistyla Gupta & Wirth, 1968 c g
 Stilobezzia crassivenosa Gupta & Wirth, 1968 c g
 Stilobezzia crossi Meillon & Wirth, 1981 c g
 Stilobezzia curvistyla Cazorla & Spinelli, 2006 c g
 Stilobezzia debilipes Gupta & Wirth, 1968 c g
 Stilobezzia decora Kieffer, 1916 c g
 Stilobezzia differens Meillon, 1960 c g
 Stilobezzia diminuta Lane & Forattini, 1958 c g
 Stilobezzia distinctifasciata Gupta & Wirth, 1968 c g
 Stilobezzia diversa (Coquillett, 1901) i c g
 Stilobezzia djalonensis Clastrier, 1991 c g
 Stilobezzia donskoffi Clastrier, 1988 c g
 Stilobezzia dorsofasciata (Lutz, 1914) c g
 Stilobezzia dorsosignata Sinha, Dasgupta & Chaudhuri, 2003 c g
 Stilobezzia douryi Clastrier, 1963 c g
 Stilobezzia dryadum Macfie, 1940 c g
 Stilobezzia dubitans Lane, Forattini & Rabello, 1955 c g
 Stilobezzia dureti Lane & Forattini, 1958 c g
 Stilobezzia dycei Wirth & Grogan, 1988 c g
 Stilobezzia edwardsi Ingram & Macfie, 1931 c g
 Stilobezzia elegantula (Johannsen, 1907) i c g
 Stilobezzia eliptaminensis Tokunaga, 1963 c g
 Stilobezzia ensistyla Chaudhuri, Guha & Gupta, 1981 c g
 Stilobezzia erectiseta Liu, Ge & Liu, 1996 c g
 Stilobezzia esmeralda Lane & Forattini, 1958 c g
 Stilobezzia eximitarsis Gupta & Wirth, 1968 c g
 Stilobezzia fasciscutata Gupta & Wirth, 1968 c g
 Stilobezzia femoralis Lane & Forattini, 1956 c g
 Stilobezzia festiva Kieffer, 1911 c g
 Stilobezzia fiebrigi Kieffer, 1917 c g
 Stilobezzia fitzroyensis Lee, 1948 c g
 Stilobezzia flavida Meillon & Wirth, 1987 c g
 Stilobezzia flavipectoralis Remm, 1993 c g
 Stilobezzia flavirostris Winnertz, 1852 c g
 Stilobezzia flavizonata Tokunaga, 1963 c g
 Stilobezzia fortipes Gupta & Wirth, 1968 c g
 Stilobezzia fortistyla Gupta & Wirth, 1968 c g
 Stilobezzia foyi (Ingram & Macfie, 1921) c g
 Stilobezzia fulva Meillon & Downes, 1986 c g
 Stilobezzia fulvacea Remm, 1980 c g
 Stilobezzia fulviscuta Tokunaga & Murachi, 1959 c g
 Stilobezzia furcellata Remm, 1980 c g
 Stilobezzia furcipes Meillon, 1960 c g
 Stilobezzia furva Ingram & Macfie, 1931 c g
 Stilobezzia fuscidorsum Kieffer, 1921 c g
 Stilobezzia fuscigenua Tokunaga & Murachi, 1959 c g
 Stilobezzia fuscipes Gupta & Wirth, 1968 c g
 Stilobezzia fusciscutellata Tokunaga & Murachi, 1959 c g
 Stilobezzia fusciterga Gupta & Wirth, 1968 c g
 Stilobezzia fuscula Wirth, 1952 i c g
 Stilobezzia fusistylata Tokunaga & Murachi, 1959 c g
 Stilobezzia gallica Clastrier, 1991 c g
 Stilobezzia gambiae Clastrier & Wirth, 1961 c g
 Stilobezzia genitalis Lee, 1948 c g
 Stilobezzia gigantiforceps Clastrier, 1989 c g
 Stilobezzia glauca Macfie, 1939 i c g
 Stilobezzia gracilis (Haliday, 1833) c g
 Stilobezzia grandis Lane & Forattini, 1958 c g
 Stilobezzia gressitti Tokunaga & Murachi, 1959 c g
 Stilobezzia guarani  g
 Stilobezzia guianae (Macfie, 1940) c
 Stilobezzia harurii Boorman & Harten, 2002 c g
 Stilobezzia hirsuta Ingram & Macfie, 1931 c g
 Stilobezzia hirta Borkent, 1997 c g
 Stilobezzia hirtaterga Yu, 1989 c g
 Stilobezzia hollandia Tokunaga, 1959 c g
 Stilobezzia huberti Gupta & Wirth, 1968 c g
 Stilobezzia immodentis Liu, Ge & Liu, 1996 c g
 Stilobezzia imparungulae Gupta & Wirth, 1968 c g
 Stilobezzia inermipes Kieffer, 1912 c g
 Stilobezzia inkisiensis Clastrier, 1986 c g
 Stilobezzia insigniforceps Clastrier, 1989 c g
 Stilobezzia insolita Gupta & Wirth, 1968 c g
 Stilobezzia intermedia Meillon, 1939 c g
 Stilobezzia isthmostheca Gupta & Wirth, 1968 c g
 Stilobezzia kiefferi Lane, 1947 i c g
 Stilobezzia kindiae Clastrier, 1991 c g
 Stilobezzia kisantuensis Clastrier, 1986 c g
 Stilobezzia kunashiri Remm, 1993 c g
 Stilobezzia kurthi Borkent, 2000 c g
 Stilobezzia lanceloti Macfie, 1937 c g
 Stilobezzia lasioterga Gupta & Wirth, 1968 c g
 Stilobezzia lateralis (Meigen, 1838) c
 Stilobezzia latiforceps Tokunaga, 1959 c g
 Stilobezzia latistyla Clastrier, 1989 c g
 Stilobezzia latiunguis Clastrier, 1985 c g
 Stilobezzia leucopeza Clastrier, 1958 c g
 Stilobezzia limai Wirth & Derron, 1976 c g
 Stilobezzia limnophila Ingram & Macfie, 1922 c g
 Stilobezzia longicornis Goetghebuer, 1934 c g
 Stilobezzia longiforceps Clastrier, 1960 c g
 Stilobezzia longihamata Tokunaga, 1963 c g
 Stilobezzia longiradix  g
 Stilobezzia longistyla Tokunaga, 1941 c g
 Stilobezzia lutacea Edwards, 1926 c g
 Stilobezzia lutea (Malloch, 1918) i c g
 Stilobezzia luteola Meillon, 1940 c g
 Stilobezzia maai Tokunaga, 1963 c g
 Stilobezzia macclurei Gupta & Wirth, 1968 c g
 Stilobezzia macfiei Lane, 1947 c g
 Stilobezzia maculata Lane, 1947 c g
 Stilobezzia maculipes Macfie, 1933 c g
 Stilobezzia maculitibia Lane & Forattini, 1956 c g
 Stilobezzia magnitheca Gupta & Wirth, 1968 c g
 Stilobezzia mahensis Clastrier, 1983 c g
 Stilobezzia maia Lane & Forattini, 1958 c g
 Stilobezzia manaosensis Lane & Forattini, 1958 c g
 Stilobezzia merceri Cazorla, 2005 c g
 Stilobezzia minima Kieffer, 1918 c g
 Stilobezzia minuta Gupta & Wirth, 1968 c g
 Stilobezzia miripes Gupta & Wirth, 1968 c g
 Stilobezzia modesta Lane, 1947 c g
 Stilobezzia monopicta  g
 Stilobezzia monticola Tokunaga, 1940 c g
 Stilobezzia mutabilis Clastrier, 1986 c g
 Stilobezzia nasticae Meillon, 1959 c g
 Stilobezzia natalensis Meillon, 1939 c g
 Stilobezzia navaiae Wirth and Grogan, 1981 i c g
 Stilobezzia nebulosa Tokunaga, 1963 c g
 Stilobezzia nigerrima Ingram & Macfie, 1931 c g
 Stilobezzia nigriapicalis Tokunaga, 1963 c g
 Stilobezzia nigroflava Lane & Forattini, 1958 c g
 Stilobezzia nitela Yu, 2005 c g
 Stilobezzia niveus Liu, Ge & Liu, 1996 c g
 Stilobezzia notata (de Meijere, 1907) c g
 Stilobezzia nudisthmostheca Gupta & Wirth, 1968 c g
 Stilobezzia nyei Clastrier, 1983 c g
 Stilobezzia obesa Gupta & Wirth, 1968 c g
 Stilobezzia obesigenitalis Gupta & Wirth, 1968 c g
 Stilobezzia obscura Lane & Forattini, 1958 c g
 Stilobezzia ochracea (Winnertz, 1852) c
 Stilobezzia ohakunei Ingram & Macfie, 1931 c g
 Stilobezzia orientis Meillon & Wirth, 1981 c g
 Stilobezzia ornata Lane & Forattini, 1958 c g
 Stilobezzia ornaticrus Ingram & Macfie, 1931 c g
 Stilobezzia ornatithorax Clastrier, 1991 c g
 Stilobezzia oxiana Remm, 1980 c g
 Stilobezzia pallescens Lane & Forattini, 1958 c g
 Stilobezzia pallidicornis Tokunaga & Murachi, 1959 c g
 Stilobezzia pallidipes Clastrier, 1983 c g
 Stilobezzia pallidiventris (Malloch, 1915) i c g
 Stilobezzia palpalis Tokunaga, 1963 c g
 Stilobezzia panamensis Lane & Forattini, 1958 c g
 Stilobezzia papillata Remm, 1980 c g
 Stilobezzia papuae Tokunaga, 1963 c g
 Stilobezzia paranaense  g
 Stilobezzia parvaeungulae Gupta & Wirth, 1968 c g
 Stilobezzia parvitheca Gupta & Wirth, 1968 c g
 Stilobezzia parvula Goetghebuer, 1933 c g
 Stilobezzia pastoriana Clastrier, 1986 c g
 Stilobezzia patagonica Ingram & Macfie, 1931 c g
 Stilobezzia paucimaculata Clastrier, 1984 c g
 Stilobezzia paucipictipes Gupta & Wirth, 1968 c g
 Stilobezzia pauliani Meillon, 1961 c g
 Stilobezzia paulistensis Lane, 1947 c g
 Stilobezzia perspicua Johannsen, 1931 c g
 Stilobezzia pessoni (Neveu, 1977) c g
 Stilobezzia photophila Clastrier, 1984 c g
 Stilobezzia pictipes Kieffer, 1917 c g
 Stilobezzia poikiloptera (Ingram & Macfie, 1922) c g
 Stilobezzia postcervix Tokunaga, 1959 c g
 Stilobezzia propristyla Gupta & Wirth, 1968 c g
 Stilobezzia proxima Cazorla & Felippe-Bauer, 2017 g
 Stilobezzia pruinosa Wirth, 1952 i c
 Stilobezzia pseudofestiva Gupta & Wirth, 1968 c g
 Stilobezzia pseudonotata Gupta & Wirth, 1968 c g
 Stilobezzia punctifemorata Gupta & Wirth, 1968 c g
 Stilobezzia punctulata Lane, 1947 c g
 Stilobezzia quadrisetosa (Goetghebuer, 1933) c g
 Stilobezzia quasielegantula Cazorla & Felippe-Bauer, 2017 g
 Stilobezzia quatei Gupta & Wirth, 1968 c g
 Stilobezzia rabelloi Lane, 1947 i c g
 Stilobezzia rava Ingram & Macfie, 1931 c g
 Stilobezzia reflexa Tokunaga, 1963 c g
 Stilobezzia robusta Gupta & Wirth, 1968 c g
 Stilobezzia rotunditheca Gupta & Wirth, 1968 c g
 Stilobezzia rufa Kieffer, 1921 c g
 Stilobezzia rutshuruensis Clastrier, 1986 c g
 Stilobezzia sahariensis Kieffer, 1923 c g
 Stilobezzia samoana Edwards, 1928 c g
 Stilobezzia sanctibernardini Kieffer, 1917 c g
 Stilobezzia scutata Lane & Forattini, 1961 c g
 Stilobezzia seguyi Clastrier, 1990 c g
 Stilobezzia semiartistyla Sinha, Dasgupta & Chaudhuri, 2003 c g
 Stilobezzia setigera Tokunaga, 1959 c g
 Stilobezzia setigeripes Tokunaga, 1963 c g
 Stilobezzia setigeriscutellata Tokunaga & Murachi, 1959 c g
 Stilobezzia seychelleana Clastrier, 1983 c g
 Stilobezzia silvicola Macfie, 1940 c g
 Stilobezzia similans Lane & Forattini, 1956 c g
 Stilobezzia similisegmenta Tokunaga, 1959 c g
 Stilobezzia simplex Lane & Forattini, 1958 c g
 Stilobezzia simulator Meillon, 1960 c g
 Stilobezzia singularis Clastrier, 1985 c g
 Stilobezzia soror Johannsen, 1931 c g
 Stilobezzia spadicicoxalis Tokunaga & Murachi, 1959 c g
 Stilobezzia spadicitibialis Tokunaga & Murachi, 1959 c g
 Stilobezzia speculae Macfie, 1934 c g
 Stilobezzia spinellii Huerta & Grogan, 2017 g
 Stilobezzia spinifemorata Tokunaga, 1963 c g
 Stilobezzia spinipes Gupta & Wirth, 1968 c g
 Stilobezzia spinitarsis Gupta & Wirth, 1968 c g
 Stilobezzia spiniterga Gupta & Wirth, 1968 c g
 Stilobezzia spirogyrae Carter, Ingram & Macfie, 1921 c g
 Stilobezzia stonei Wirth, 1953 i c g
 Stilobezzia subalba Gupta & Wirth, 1968 c g
 Stilobezzia subfestiva Gupta & Wirth, 1968 c g
 Stilobezzia subflava Gupta & Wirth, 1968 c g
 Stilobezzia subnebulosa Gupta & Wirth, 1968 c g
 Stilobezzia subsessilis Kieffer, 1917 c g
 Stilobezzia subsoror Tokunaga, 1941 c g
 Stilobezzia subviridis Macfie, 1934 c g
 Stilobezzia succinea Ingram & Macfie, 1931 c g
 Stilobezzia supernotata Gupta & Wirth, 1968 c g
 Stilobezzia sybleae Wirth, 1953 i c g b
 Stilobezzia szadziewskii Chaudhuri, 1991 c g
 Stilobezzia tarsispinosa  g
 Stilobezzia tasmaniensis Lee, 1948 c g
 Stilobezzia tauffliebi Meillon, 1959 c g
 Stilobezzia tenebrosa Macfie, 1933 c g
 Stilobezzia tenuicolorata Gupta & Wirth, 1968 c g
 Stilobezzia tenuiforceps Tokunaga & Murachi, 1959 c g
 Stilobezzia tetragona Goetghebuer, 1934 c g
 Stilobezzia thibaulti (Neveu, 1977) c g
 Stilobezzia thomasi Grogan, Spinelli, Ronderos & Cazorla, 2013 g
 Stilobezzia thomsenae Wirth, 1953 i c g
 Stilobezzia thyridofera Tokunaga, 1959 c g
 Stilobezzia tibialis Lane & Forattini, 1956 c g
 Stilobezzia tomensis Wirth & Derron, 1976 c g
 Stilobezzia tonnoiri Macfie, 1932 c g
 Stilobezzia transversa Lane & Forattini, 1958 c g
 Stilobezzia traubi Gupta & Wirth, 1968 c g
 Stilobezzia travassosi Lane, 1947 c g
 Stilobezzia trilineata Meillon & Wirth, 1983 c g
 Stilobezzia trimaculata Meillon & Wirth, 1987 c g
 Stilobezzia tropica Clastrier, 1958 c g
 Stilobezzia truncata Tokunaga, 1959 c g
 Stilobezzia ugandae Ingram & Macfie, 1923 c g
 Stilobezzia unicellula Clastrier, 1985 c g
 Stilobezzia unifasciata Tokunaga, 1963 c g
 Stilobezzia unifascidorsalis Tokunaga, 1959 c g
 Stilobezzia vandeli Vattier & Adam, 1966 c g
 Stilobezzia varia Ingram & Macfie, 1931 c g
 Stilobezzia venefica Gupta & Wirth, 1968 c g
 Stilobezzia venezuelensis Ortiz, 1950 c g
 Stilobezzia versicolor (Ingram & Macfie, 1921) c
 Stilobezzia virescens Kieffer, 1919 c g
 Stilobezzia viridis (Coquillett, 1901) i c g b
 Stilobezzia viridiventris (Kieffer, 1910) c g
 Stilobezzia vittata Clastrier, 1960 c g
 Stilobezzia vittula Tokunaga, 1963 c g
 Stilobezzia vulgaris Yu, 1989 c g
 Stilobezzia williamsi Cazorla, 2005 c g
 Stilobezzia wirthi Lane & Forattini, 1956 c g
 Stilobezzia wygodzinskyi Lane, 1947 c g
 Stilobezzia xanthogaster Gupta & Wirth, 1968 c g
 Stilobezzia xerophila  g
 Stilobezzia zonata Tokunaga, 1963 c g

Data sources: i = ITIS, c = Catalogue of Life, g = GBIF, b = Bugguide.net

References

Stilobezzia
Stilobezzia
Articles created by Qbugbot